The Members are a British punk band that originated in Camberley, Surrey, England. In the UK, they are best known for their single "The Sound of the Suburbs", reaching No. 12 in 1979, and in Australia, "Radio" which reached No. 5 in 1982.

Career

The Members were formed by lyricist Nicky Tesco (Nick Lightowlers) in 1976, through an invited audition at a recording studio at Tooley Street, London. The original personnel, with Tesco (vocals), was Gary Baker (guitar), and Steve Morley (bass guitar), initially with Steve Maycock then Clive Parker (drums). Morley and Parker were later replaced by Chris Payne and Adrian Lillywhite.

In 1976, the band performed for its first engagements at The Red Cow (London W6), The Windsor Castle (London W9) and The Nashville Rooms (London W14). In that year composer Jean Marie Carroll (aka JC Carroll) joined the band to complement Tesco's lyrics. The Members had recorded a number of songs, but the first released recording was "Fear on the Streets", produced by Lillywhite's brother Steve Lillywhite. This song was included on the first record released by the Beggars Banquet label, the punk compilation Streets (1977). The song-writing collaboration between Tesco and Carroll moved The Members' sound towards an incorporation of reggae, shown in the first single released for Stiff Records, "Solitary Confinement", produced by Larry Wallis. Following these releases, band personnel became Tesco (vocals), Carroll (vocals and guitar), Nigel Bennett (guitar), Payne (bass) and Lillywhite (drums).

In 1978/79, the Members continued to play the London pub and club circuit, became a feature in the music press and were championed by John Peel. They signed to Virgin Records in 1978, for which label they recorded "The Sound of the Suburbs", again produced by Steve Lillywhite. This became The Members' biggest chart success and their best-known song in the UK. The follow-up single, "Offshore Banking Business", a reggae tune written by Carroll, based on his experiences working in offshore banking at the private bank Coutts, did not achieve the same popularity. A version of "Offshore Banking Business" was recorded for the early 1980s film Urgh! A Music War, produced by Michael White, distributed by Filmways and Lorimar Productions.

The Members' first album, At the Chelsea Nightclub, was followed by a second for Virgin, 1980 – The Choice Is Yours.  Augmented by saxophonists Steve (Rudi) Thomson and Simon Lloyd (the latter of whom also provided horns and additional keyboards), the group recorded what would turn out to be their final album.  This last album was first issued in the US as Uprhythm, Downbeat in 1982, and it surfaced in the UK a year later, retitled Going West. The album featured the singles "Radio," which made no. 5 in Australia, and Working Girl, the music video for which gave the band exposure in North America via MTV.

The band broke up in 1983, when Tesco left the band after the last tour of the US. JC Carroll formed the UK Fashion House "The Dispensary with his then Wife Sophy Lynn and Began working on film sound tracks most notably with Producer Stephen Malit and Director Julien Temple  Lillywhite went on to join the band King in the mid-1980s in time for their second album.  Lloyd soon joined the Australian band Icehouse, remaining with them for their international smash hits "Electric Blue" and "Crazy."  In 1989, Tesco appeared in Leningrad Cowboys Go America, written and directed by Aki Kaurismäki, a film about a fictional Russian rock band touring the US. This fictional band then toured as an actual band, and recorded the Tesco song "Thru the Wire". Kaurismäki directed a video for "Thru the Wire", featuring Tesco. As well as working as a music journalist for the magazine Music Week, Tesco has been a commentator on new releases for BBC 6 Music's "Roundtable".

Reunion incarnation
In 2008 the original line up of the  band reformed to play two concerts , then a line up of Carroll, Payne and Nick Cash resumed touring, In 2009 a new single "International Financial Crisis" (a re-write of "Offshore Banking Business") was released, recorded by Tesco, Carroll, Payne and Bennett, with artwork by the original Members' album sleeve designer, Malcolm Garrett. This line up played Glastonbury and Isle of Wight festivals. The Members line-up of Carroll, Payne and Rat Scabies (drums) performed from 2010 to 2013, playing over 90 Shows including 3 European Tours and New Zealand and Australian Tours. Nick Cash rejoined the band in 2014.

In March 2012, the Members released their fourth studio album, InGrrLand, featuring Carroll, Payne, Bennett, Cash and Rat Scabies. in December 2013 Nigel Bennett rejoined the Members. In 2014 The Members (comprising Carroll, Bennett and Cash), mounted a 23-date tour of the US; Carroll on bass guitar and lead vocals, Bennett on lead guitar, and Cash on drums. This was the band's first tour of the US for 32 years.

In 2015, the band began work on their fifth studio album in studios in London and West Byfleet featuring a nucleus of Carroll, Cash, Payne and Bennett together with guest appearances from Guy Pratt and former Jam guitarist Steve Brookes. One Law, released in early 2016, was produced by Carroll, and received reviews in Louder Than War, The Aberdeen Voice, Record Collector and Vive Le Rock.

In 2021 The Band released their 7th Studio Album "Bedsitland" to critical acclaim  and JC's Carroll definitive story of the Band (Still) Annoying the Neighbours was published 

Since Reforming the Members have performed  all over the World; apart from a break for the pandemic, they continue to perform.

On 26 February 2022, it was announced that Tesco had died, at the age of 67. The BBC's Johnny Walker and JC Carroll pay tribute to Tesco on the ever popular Sounds of the 70's Radio show.

Discography

Albums

Singles

Compilation appearances
Streets (Beggars Banquet 1977 Track: "Fear on the Streets")
The Moonlight Tapes (Danceville Records 1977 Track: "Rat Up a Drainpipe")
The Sound of the Suburbs (Columbia Records MOOD18 (1991) Track: "The Sounds of the Suburbs")

Line-ups

Timeline

References

External links
The Members Official YouTube Channel
The Members web site
Nick Tesco music review blog.
Review of The Members in Sacramento 2014
Record Collector Article September 2015
J C Carroll Official Site
Nicky Tesco filmography
Nick Cash: a bio
Nick (Nicky) Tesco biographical videos.
Guardian Newspaper April 2021.
Vive Le Rock Magazine JC Carroll Book Review April 2021.
Louder then War Magazine - JC Carroll Book Review April 2021.
 
 

English punk rock groups
English new wave musical groups
Musical groups established in 1975
Musical groups disestablished in 1983
Musical groups reestablished in 2007
Reggae rock groups
People from Camberley